Andreas Rossak (born 9 July 1999) is an Austrian football player. He plays for 1. Simmeringer SC.

Club career
He made his Austrian Football First League debut for Floridsdorfer AC on 4 August 2017 in a game against SV Ried.

References

External links
 
 Andreas Rossak at ÖFB

1999 births
Living people
Austrian footballers
Association football forwards
Floridsdorfer AC players
1. Simmeringer SC players
2. Liga (Austria) players